The 2003–04 Tunisian Ligue Professionnelle 1 season was the 78th season of top-tier football in Tunisia.

Results

League table

Result table

Leaders

References
2003–04 Ligue 1 on RSSSF.com

Tunisian Ligue Professionnelle 1 seasons
1
Tun